A Fugue in Time is a 1945 novel by the British writer Rumer Godden. In the United States it was published under the alternative title Take Three Tenses. The plot explores the history of a London house and the family who have lived in it for many decades.

Film adaptation
It was made into a 1948 Hollywood film Enchantment directed by Irving Reis and starring David Niven, Teresa Wright and Evelyn Keyes.

References

Bibliography
 Goble, Alan. The Complete Index to Literary Sources in Film. Walter de Gruyter, 1999.
 Le-Guilcher, Lucy. Rumer Godden: International and Intermodern Storyteller. Routledge, 2016.

1945 British novels
Novels by Rumer Godden
Novels set in London
British novels adapted into films
Michael Joseph books